Nelson Loyola (born 3 August 1968) is a Cuban fencer. He won a bronze medal in the team épée event at the 2000 Summer Olympics.

His son, Neisser Loyola, an épée fencer representing Belgium, earned a bronze medal in the individual men's epee at the 2022 World Fencing Championships.

References

External links
 

1968 births
Living people
Cuban male fencers
Olympic fencers of Cuba
Fencers at the 2000 Summer Olympics
Olympic bronze medalists for Cuba
Olympic medalists in fencing
Medalists at the 2000 Summer Olympics
Pan American Games medalists in fencing
Pan American Games gold medalists for Cuba
Pan American Games silver medalists for Cuba
Fencers at the 2003 Pan American Games
Medalists at the 2003 Pan American Games
20th-century Cuban people
21st-century Cuban people